is a private junior college in Nagahama, Shiga, Japan, established in 1952.

It is a part of the Shohsui Gakuen Group (学校法人松翠学園) and is Gifu Prefecture's sole school only for boys.

See also
Other institutions operated by the Shohsui Gakuen Group:
Gifu Daiichi High School

References

External links
 Official website 

Educational institutions established in 1952
Private universities and colleges in Japan
Universities and colleges in Shiga Prefecture
Japanese junior colleges
1952 establishments in Japan